Malcolm Alexander Johnson (born August 27, 1977) is a former American football wide receiver who played two seasons in the National Football League (NFL) with the Pittsburgh Steelers and New York Jets. He was drafted by the Pittsburgh Steelers in the fifth round of the 1999 NFL Draft. He played college football at the University of Notre Dame and attended Gonzaga College High School in Washington D.C. He was also a member of the Ottawa Renegades of the Canadian Football League (CFL).

References

External links
Just Sports Stats
College stats

Living people
1977 births
American football wide receivers
Canadian football wide receivers
African-American players of American football
African-American players of Canadian football
Gonzaga College High School alumni
Notre Dame Fighting Irish football players
Pittsburgh Steelers players
New York Jets players
Ottawa Renegades players
Players of American football from Washington, D.C.
21st-century African-American sportspeople
20th-century African-American sportspeople